José Heriberto Izquierdo Mena (born 7 July 1992) is a Colombian professional footballer who plays as a left winger for the Colombia national team.

Club career
Izquierdo started playing football at an early age, starting out as a goalkeeper before moving outfield into a midfield/winger position. His parents initially wanted him to become a tennis player, however Izquierdo "constantly preferred to kick tennis balls with his feet rather than use rackets, and his teacher promptly advised him to switch to his natural sport". Izquierdo would subsequently abandon football for several years following his brother's death in a traffic accident, before eventually returning to join Deportivo Pereira.

Izquierdo joined Once Caldas in 2013 from Deportivo Pereira, and moved to Club Brugge one year later.

Club Brugge
In his first season with Club Brugge, the 2014–15 season, Izquierdo scored 13 Belgian Pro League goals for the club, and also made six UEFA Europa League appearances as Brugge finished top of their group in the group stage of the competition, advancing through to the quarter-finals before being knocked out by Ukrainian club FC Dnipro 1–0 on aggregate. Izquierdo started in both legs of the quarter final.

Izquierdo won the Belgian Pro League with Club Brugge in the 2015–16 season, finishing top of the table in the regular season and winning the Championship play-offs with the club. He contributed 7 league goals in 24 Pro League appearances, and also made several appearances in Brugge's UEFA Europa League campaign. He was also the winner of the Belgian Golden Shoe award for 2016 in recognition of his performances throughout the season at Brugge.

Throughout the 2016–17 season, Izquierdo made 32 appearances for Club Brugge, scoring 14 Belgian First Division A goals to help them finish second in the league's regular season, these including braces against Oostende and Mouscron, as well as a hat-trick against Charleroi on 5 May 2017. He also scored one UEFA Champions League goal in a 2–1 defeat to English champions Leicester City on 22 November 2016. Izquierdo's goal against Leicester was described as "a thumping finish following a terrific solo run".

Brighton & Hove Albion
On 10 August 2017, it was announced that newly-promoted Premier League club Brighton & Hove Albion had agreed a club record transfer fee with Club Brugge for Izquierdo, reported to be around £13.5 million. He will join Brighton subject to a medical, international clearance and a successful work permit application. Izquierdo passed his Brighton medical on 12 August 2017, with his work permit hearing scheduled for the following Wednesday. On 16 August 2017, Club Brugge confirmed that Izquierdo's work permit had been granted and that he would be joining Brighton. He was officially unveiled as a Brighton player on 21 August, taking the number 19 shirt and signing a four-year contract with the Albion.

Izqueirdo made his Premier League debut for Brighton on 26 August 2017, coming on as a second half substitute in a 0–0 away draw against Watford.

On 20 October 2017, Izquierdo scored his first goal for Brighton in a 3–0 away win against West Ham United, a spectacular curled effort from distance. He scored his second league goal of the season on 20 November, the equalising goal in a 2–2 home draw against Stoke City. He scored another speculator goal against West Ham on 3 February 2018, producing a moment of quality, curling it over everyone from the corner edge of the penalty area putting The Seagulls 2–1 ahead in an eventual 3–1 victory.

On 1 January 2018, Izquierdo provided two assists in Brighton's 2–2 home draw against AFC Bournemouth, winning the Man of the Match award.

Izquierdo has been hit by many injuries during his time in Sussex including having to have knee surgery and as a result of this and his other injuries he didn't play any games for The Seagulls in the 2019–20 season.

Izquierdo was still recovering from his injuries at the start of the 2020–21 season, however he returned to action with Brighton's U23's in the Premier League 2 picking up one goal and a assist in five appearances before another injury set back, this time to his hamstring in December 2020. He made his return to the senior matchday squad on 31 January 2021 in a home fixture against Tottenham Hotspur in which he remained an unused substitute in the 1–0 win. 

Izquierdo made his first appearance for the first team in two–and–a–half years, returning from his injuries, coming on as a substitute in the 82nd minute for Leandro Trossard in the 1–0 away loss to already relegated Sheffield United on 24 April 2021. Speaking to The Argus during the week after his return to action, Izquierdo admitted that whilst injured he feared his career was over being told, "that there was the possibility of not playing again." In the same interview commenting on his speculation about his future at the club he admitted, "I'd prefer to stay in the Premier League for the rest of my life. For me it's the best league in the world."

After playing one game in the 2020–21 season after returning from a long period out due to injuries, it was announced on 4 June 2021 that Izquierdo was to be released when his contract expires on 30 June. With his injury-hit spell at The Seagulls lasting four seasons, he made 54 appearances, scoring five times and helping the club establish itself in the Premier League.

Return to Brugge
On 31 August 2021, he returned to Club Brugge, where at first he was expected to continue recovering from his injuries and not immediately play. Nevertheless, Brugge registered him as a player with the league.

International career
Izquierdo received his first callup to the Colombia national team for friendlies in June 2017 against Spain and Cameroon. He scored his first goal at international level in the friendly against Cameroon on 13 June 2017, the fourth goal in a 4–0 victory.

In June 2018 he was named in Colombia's 23 man squad for the 2018 World Cup in Russia. His only game was where Colombia lost to Japan 2–1 in their opening group game.

Career statistics

Club

International

Scores and results list Colombia's goal tally first.

Honours
Club Brugge
Belgian First Division: 2015–16, 2021–22
Belgian Cup: 2014–15
Belgian Super Cup: 2016

Individual
Belgian Golden Shoe: 2016

References

1992 births
Living people
People from Pereira, Colombia
Colombian footballers
Association football defenders
Once Caldas footballers
Deportivo Pereira footballers
Club Brugge KV players
Brighton & Hove Albion F.C. players
Categoría Primera A players
Categoría Primera B players
Belgian Pro League players
Premier League players
Expatriate footballers in Belgium
Colombian expatriate sportspeople in Belgium
Expatriate footballers in England
Colombian expatriate sportspeople in England
Colombian expatriate footballers
2018 FIFA World Cup players
Colombia international footballers